Live With Royal Northern Sinfonia is a 2017 live album featuring Lanterns on the Lake with the Royal Northern Sinfonia orchestra.

In February 2016, Lanterns on the Lake performed a  one-off show at Sage Gateshead with the Royal Northern Sinfonia in a unique revision of their catalogue. Fiona Brice,  wrote the arrangements.

The show was recorded and released via Bella Union on vinyl in 2017, with a digital release prior to this.

References

2017 live albums
Bella Union albums
Lanterns on the Lake albums